Sound the Alarm is an EP by the American ska punk band Less Than Jake which was released on CD and (colored) 12" vinyl by Pure Noise Records on 3 February 2017.  It was mixed and mastered by Jason Livermore at The Blasting Room, and co-produced by singer and bassist Roger Lima and the band at The Moathouse.

Track listing 
Track listing per sleeve.

 Call to Arms – 2:36
 Whatever the Weather – 3:00
 Bomb Drop – 3:06
 Welcome to My Life – 2:43
 Good Sign – 3:28
 Years of Living Dangerously – 3:08
 Things Change – 2:48

Personnel
Personnel per sleeve.

Less Than Jake
 Chris DeMakes – vocals, guitar
 Roger Lima – vocals, bass guitar
 Peter "JR" Wasilewski – tenor saxophone
 Buddy Schaub – trombone
 Vinnie Fiorello – drums

Production and design
 Roger Lima – producer, engineer
 Less Than Jake – producer
 Jason Livermore – mixing, mastering
 Doug Dean – art layout, design

References 

Less Than Jake albums
2017 EPs
Pure Noise Records EPs